Chris Patrick-Simpson is a Northern Irish actor. Patrick-Simpson is best known for his role as Brendan in the film The Magdalene Sisters. He has also appeared in the film The Boxer, the TV Drama The Clinic and Fifty Dead Men Walking. He is married and currently in Canada.

Career
In 2018, he guest-starred in an episode of The CW series Supernatural.

Filmography

External links

References

1979 births
Living people
Male film actors from Northern Ireland
Male television actors from Northern Ireland